The enhanced avionics system (or EASy) is an integrated modular avionics suite and cockpit display system used on Dassault Falcon business jets since Falcon 900EX, and later used in other newer Falcon aircraft such as Falcon 2000EX and Falcon 7X.

EASy has been jointly developed by Dassault and Honeywell, and is based on Honeywell Primus Epic.

History
Dassault Aviation started to develop the EASy flight deck concept in the mid-1990s with a goal to have a much better integration of aircraft systems such as FMS.

EASy was first integrated and certificated on Falcon 900EX. The first EASy equipped 900EX was delivered in December 2003. Honeywell Primus Epic base of EASy was then integrated on other business jets and helicopters.

EASy was certified on the Falcon 2000EX in June 2004 with deliveries starting shortly after. Falcon 7X was developed from the ground-up with EASy avionics.

In October 2008, Dassault announced the launch of EASy phase II program at the annual NBAA meeting in Orlando. EASy phase II include several enhancements to EASy, such as:
 Synthetic vision system
 ADS-B Out
 paperless charts
 Future Air Navigation System (FANS-1/A) using Controller Pilot Data Link Communications (CPDLC)
 Localizer Performance with Vertical guidance (LPV)

EASy Phase II was certified on Falcon 900LX in June 2011  and on Falcon 7X in May 2013
.

Architecture
EASy architecture is based on Integrated Modular Avionics. The processing modules are called MAU (Modular Avionics Units). The core Operating System of EASy is provided by DDCI.

See also
 Integrated Modular Avionics (IMA)
 Cockpit display system
 Dassault Falcon 7X
 Dassault Aviation

References

External links
User Forum for EASy users

Avionics
Aircraft instruments